Aleksandr Yuryevich Dereven (born 26 March 1992) is a former Russian handball player for the Russian national team.

He participated at the 2015 World Men's Handball Championship in Qatar.

References

1992 births
Living people
Russian male handball players
Sportspeople from Tolyatti
RK Vardar players
Expatriate handball players
Russian expatriate sportspeople in North Macedonia